Iglesia de Nuestra Señora de la Luz, or simply Iglesia de la Luz, is an historic church in the city of Puebla, in the Mexican state of Puebla.

References

External links

 

Roman Catholic churches in Puebla (city)